Windham County is a county located in the northeastern corner of the U.S. state of Connecticut. As of the 2020 census, the population was 116,418, making it the least populous county in Connecticut. It forms the core of the region known as the Quiet Corner. Windham County is included in the Worcester, MA-CT Metropolitan Statistical Area, which is also included in the Boston-Worcester-Providence, MA-RI-NH-CT Combined Statistical Area. The entire county is within the Quinebaug and Shetucket Rivers Valley National Heritage Corridor, as designated by the National Park Service.

History
The area that is now Windham County became of interest to the English around 1635, but went unsettled for over fifty years due to its lack of access to the shore. John Winthrop the Younger took a strong interest to this land, purchased land from the Narragansetts, and was given permission by the court of Connecticut to settle in October 1671. In 1678, a tract of land, called Joshua's Tract (Joshua was the son of Mohegan chief Uncas), was willed to Connecticut officials, and in February 1682, it was gifted to Samuel and Daniel Mason. In 1684, 1200 acres of land was sold to Jonathan Curtis, Thomas Dudley and Samuel Mason, among others, by the Nipmunks.

Windham County was created from Hartford and New London counties on May 12, 1726, by an act of the Connecticut General Court. The act establishing the county states:
That the west bounds of the town of Lebanon, the north
bounds of Coventry, the north bounds of Mansfield till it
meet with the southwest bounds of Ashford, the west bounds
of Ashford, the east bounds of Stafford, the Massachusetts
line on the north, and Rhode Island line on the east, the north
bounds of Preston, and north bounds of Norwich, containing
the towns of Windham, Lebanon, Plainfield, Canterbury,
Mansfield, Coventry, Pomfret, Killingly, Ashford, Voluntown
and Mortlake, shall be one entire county, and called by the
name of County of Windham.

In May 1749, the town of Woodstock (formerly New Roxbury), Worcester County, Province of Massachusetts Bay, was unilaterally annexed by Connecticut Colony and assigned to Windham County. In 1785, the town of Union (incorporated in 1734) was transferred to the newly formed Tolland County. Over the next century, Windham County would lose several towns to Tolland and New London counties: Coventry to Tolland in 1786, Lebanon to New London in 1824, Columbia and Mansfield to Tolland in 1827, and Voluntown to New London in 1881. New towns were formed over the years using land from the original towns of the county: Thompson in 1785, Brooklyn and Hampton in 1786, Sterling in 1794, Chaplin in 1822, Eastford in 1847, Putnam in 1855, and Scotland in 1857. The final boundary adjustment occurred on April 7, 1885, when the boundary dispute between the towns of Windham and Mansfield was resolved.

Geography

The highest point in Windham County is Snow Hill in Ashford at 1,210 feet.

Adjacent counties
Worcester County, Massachusetts (north)
Providence County, Rhode Island (east)
Kent County, Rhode Island (southeast)
New London County (south)
Tolland County (west)

Climate

Government
County level government in the state of Connecticut was abolished in 1960. All government affairs and services are administered by either the state or local municipality.

The office of county high sheriff was abolished by constitutional referendum in 2000. All former functions of the county sheriff's office are now carried out by the state marshals service. The last high sheriff (or official for that matter) of Windham County was Thomas W. White, who left office in 2000 due to the discontinuation of the county sheriff's departments in Connecticut.

Transportation

Roads
Major highways through Windham County include Interstate 395, which runs north–south from the New London County line at Plainfield to the Massachusetts state line at Thompson. The southern part of I-395 is part of the Connecticut Turnpike, which branches off the interstate in Killingly and runs east–west from I-395 exit 35, to U.S. Route 6 at the Rhode Island state line.

Other north–south routes include Route 12, which parallels I-395 through many local communities, Route 169, a National Scenic Byway traveling through rural communities from the New London County line in Canterbury to the Massachusetts state line in Woodstock. Other secondary north–south roads are Routes 89, 198, 97, 21, and 49.

Major east–west routes are U.S. Route 44 from the Tolland County line at Ashford to the Rhode Island state line at Putnam, and U.S. Route 6 from the Tolland County line at Windham to the Rhode Island state line at Killingly. U.S. Route 6 has short expressway segments in Windham and Killingly. Other secondary east–west roads are Routes 14, 101, 171, and 197.

Air
Windham Airport is the primary airport for the county, located 3 miles from Willimantic. Other smaller airports include Woodstock Airport and Danielson Airport.

Biking
There are many bike paths in the county. The major two trails are the Air Line State Park Trail and the Hop River State Park Trail, both these trails enter the county through Windham. The Hop River Trail ends at the Air Line Trail shortly after entering the county, while the Air Line Trail continues all the way into Putnam. Another section of the Air Line Trail is in Thompson, which continues to the border with Massachusetts which it counties as the Southern New England Trunkline Trail. Another shorter trail is the Moosup Valley State Park Trail that starts in Plainfield and continues down into the state border with Rhode Island which it continues as Washington Secondary Rail Trail. Smaller trails include the Quinebaug River Trail and the Putman River Trail.

Law enforcement
The primary law enforcement agency most Windham County towns is the Connecticut State Police, primarily Troop D based in Danielson which serves Brooklyn, Canterbury, Chaplin, Eastford, Hampton, Killingly, Pomfret, Putnam (outside the SSD), Scotland, Sterling, Thompson, Woodstock and I-395 between exit 28 and the MA border. Troop C, based in Tolland, covers the town of Ashford, and Troop K, based in Colchester, covers the town of Windham.

Only three municipalities in the county (the town of Plainfield, the Willimantic Special Services District, and the Putnam Special Services District), have their own local police departments that serve as the primary law enforcement in those areas. Eastern Connecticut State University located in Willimantic also has its own local police department (established under Connecticut General Statutes Sec. 10a-142) which serves as the primary law enforcement agency for the university campus even though they are located within the Willimantic Special Services District.

The Windham County Sheriff's Department was disbanded in 2000 and their former duties are now carried out by the Connecticut State Marshals Service.

Most towns in the county have local Constables that carry out some municipal legal and security functions.

Demographics

As of the 2010 United States Census, there were 118,428 people, 44,810 households, and 30,343 families residing in the county. The racial makeup of the county was 89.6% white, 2.2% black or African American, 1.2% Asian, 0.5% American Indian, 4.2% from other races, and 2.3% from two or more races. Those of Hispanic or Latino origin made up 9.6% of the population. In terms of ancestry, 18.8% were Irish, 13.5% were English, 11.7% were French Canadian, 11.5% were Italian, 10.2% were German, 9.3% were Polish, and 2.9% were American.

Of the 44,810 households, 32.6% had children under the age of 18 living with them, 50.0% were married couples living together, 12.3% had a female householder with no husband present, 32.3% were non-families, and 24.6% of all households were made up of individuals. The average household size was 2.54 and the average family size was 3.01. The median age was 39.2 years.

The median income for a household in the county was $59,370 and the median income for a family was $69,642. Males had a median income of $48,880 versus $36,873 for females. The per capita income for the county was $26,457. About 8.7% of families and 11.4% of the population were below the poverty line, including 16.0% of those under age 18 and 7.7% of those age 65 or over.

Demographics breakdown by town

Data is from the 2010 United States Census and the 2006-2010 American Community Survey 5-Year Estimates.

Politics
Windham County had trended Democratic at the presidential level over the last quarter century, until it voted for Donald Trump in 2016. It backed Trump again in 2020 with a higher vote share, but by a smaller margin due to vote splitting by third parties in 2016.

|}

Communities
Boroughs are incorporated portions of one or more towns with separate borough councils, zoning boards, and borough officials. Villages are named localities, but have no separate corporate existence from the towns they are in.

Ashford
Lake Chaffee
Brooklyn
Brooklyn
East Brooklyn
Canterbury
Chaplin
Eastford
Hampton
Killingly
Danielson
Dayville
Plainfield
Central Village
Moosup
Plainfield Village
Wauregan
Pomfret
Putnam
Putnam District
Scotland
Sterling
Oneco
Thompson
Fabyan
Mechanicsville
North Grosvenor Dale
Quinebaug
Windham
South Windham
Willimantic
Woodstock
Lake Bungee
Quasset Lake
South Woodstock
Witches Woods

Education
School districts include:

K-12:

 Killingly School District
 Plainfield School District
 Putnam School District
 Thompson School District
 Windham School District

Secondary:
 Regional High School District 19
 Regional High School District 11

Elementary:

 Ashford School District
 Brooklyn School District
 Canterbury School District
 Chaplin School District
 Eastford School District
 Hampton School District
 Pomfret School District
 Scotland School District
 Sterling School District
 Woodstock School District

There is also Woodstock Academy, a privately-endowed publicly-funded high school.

See also

 National Register of Historic Places listings in Windham County, Connecticut

References

External links
 Windham County Sheriff's Department
 National Register of Historic Places listing for Windham Co., Connecticut

 

 
1726 establishments in Connecticut
1960 disestablishments in Connecticut
Counties in Greater Boston
Worcester, MA–CT metropolitan area
Populated places established in 1726